Amar Upadhyay (born 1 August 1976) is an Indian actor. He started his career with modelling and he is best known for his collaborations with Ekta Kapoor in the television shows namely Kyunki Saas Bhi Kabhi Bahu Thi (2000-2002), Kalash (2001), Kasautii Zindagii Kay (2005), Kkusum (2005), Molkki (2020–2022) etc. 

His other television shows include Dekh Bhai Dekh (1993-1994), Viraasat (2006-2007), Chand Ke Paar Chalo (2008-2009), Saath Nibhaana Saathiya (2015-2017), Ishqbaaaz (2019). Apart from television shows, he has appeared in many films like Dhoondte Reh Jaaoge! (1998), Dhund: The Fog (2003), LOC Kargil (2003), 13B (2009), It's My Life (2020), Kaagaz (2021) and Bhool Bhulaiyaa 2 (2022).

Early life
Amar Upadhyay was born on 1 August 1976 in Ahmedabad, Gujarat into a Gujarati family. He grew up in the Malad suburb of Mumbai, and studied chemical engineering in college. After college he attended the Film and Television Institute of India in Pune.

Career
In 1993, some of his photographs appeared in Stardust magazine, which led to Jaya Bachchan offering him the TV series Dekh Bhai Dekh. This was followed by numerous TV series like Arzoo, Suhana Safar, Tulsi and Aruna Irani's Mehndi Tere Naam Ki.

Eventually, he became famous in 2000 with the mega TV daily soap, Kyunki Saas Bhi Kabhi Bahu Thi (2000). In fact, when his character Mihir 'died' in 2001, it was followed by protest marches, the TV channel's head office was flooded with phone-calls and letters, eventually his character came back to life, and he is still recounted amongst TV superstars.

After his success in television, he ventured into film with Dahshat 2003, followed by a big launch, Dhund – The Fog (2003), along with Aditi Govitrikar, directed by Sham Ramsay, though later he also appeared in J.P. Dutta's war movie, LOC Kargil (2003). He also done a recurring role in R Madhavan starrer 13B (2009). He also appeared in some bhojpuri films like Dharam Veer (2008), Hum Bahubali (2008), Tu Babuaa Hamaar (2008), E Rishta Anmol Baa (2009). Unfortunately, his film career did not turn out as expected.

Subsequently, he returned to television after a two-year hiatus, playing a key role in the serial Chand Ke Paar Chalo  (2009) on NDTV Imagine. Then he appeared in many television serials mostly playing recurring or negative roles namely in Doli Saja Ke (2009), Sapna Babul Ka...Bidaai (2009), Police Files (2012), Ek Thhi Naayka (2013) and Savdhaan India (2013). In October 2011 he joined the fifth season of the reality TV series Bigg Boss and finished in fifth place.

In 2015, he entered Star Plus's popular long-running series Saath Nibhaana Saathiya as the parallel lead role of Dharam Suryavanshi opposite Tanya Sharma. He played Dharam's character till the ending of the show in 2017. For his portrayal of Dharam Suryavanshi, he won the Gold Award for best supporting actor. He also starred in Sony Entertainment Television show Ek Deewaana Tha (2017–18) as Rajan Bedi, the antagonist. His performance in the show, was highly praised.

In November 2020, Amar reunited with her Kyunki Saas Bhi Kabhi Bahu Thi producers Ekta Kapoor and Shobha Kapoor for a television show titled as Molkki. So then onwards, he is playing the main lead Virendra Pratap Singh in Molkki which is being aired on Colors TV. In 2021, he appeared in the Satish Kaushik directorial Kaagaz, which stars Pankaj Tripathi in lead. He played the role of Vidhayak Jaganpal Singh, the main antagonist. The film was released on Zee5 and produced by Salman Khan.

Amar also made an small appearance in the Abhishek Bachchan starrer Bob Biswas (2021), which was directed by Sujoy Ghosh's daughter Diya Ghosh in her directorial debut. It was released on Zee5. He was also seen in Anees Bazmee directorial Bhool Bhulaiyaa 2, the film stars Kartik Aaryan, Kiara Advani and Tabu in lead.

He was also set to appear in the show as a lead in Nima Denzongpa, but his entry was later scrapped due to show going off-air.

In 2022, he portrayed Rama in Dangal channel television show Jai Hanuman - Sankat Mochan Naam Tiharo. Later that year, he announced his television show Kyunkii Tum Hi Ho, as an actor and a producer. The show will air on channel Shemaroo Umang.

Personal life
He has been married to Hetal Upadhyay since 5 March 1999, who is an engineer. They have a son Aryaman and a daughter Chenab.

He is also a black belt holder in Taekwondo.

Filmography

Films

Television

Awards and nominations

References

External links

 
 

Living people
Indian male film actors
Male actors in Hindi cinema
Indian male taekwondo practitioners
Indian male television actors
Film and Television Institute of India alumni
Male actors from Mumbai
20th-century Indian male actors
21st-century Indian male actors
Gujarati people
Bigg Boss (Hindi TV series) contestants
1976 births